Aurelle-Verlac (Languedocien: Aurèla e Verlac) is a former commune in the Aveyron department in the Occitanie region of southern France. On 1 January 2016, it was merged into the new commune of Saint-Geniez-d'Olt-et-d'Aubrac.

The inhabitants of the commune are known as Aurellacois or Aurellacoises.

Geography
Aurelle-Verlac is located in the Massif Central in Aubrac some 60 km east of Decazeville and 70 km south-east of Aurillac with the eastern border of the commune being the border between Aveyron and Lozère departments. Access to the commune is by road D503 from Saint-Geniez-d'Olt in the south which goes north through the village and most of the length of the commune before going west to join the D219 west of the commune. Apart from the village there are the hamlets of Crespiac, Verelaguet, Les Mazes, La Frassinede, Naves d'Aubrac, La Molière, Moncan, Rieuzens, Bernie, Les Caps, and Les Ginestes. The commune is mainly deep valleys where boraldes flow down to the Lot. The highest point in the department is on the Signal de Mailhe-Biau in the north-east of the commune. It is located in a Natura 2000 zone and is rugged with forests and high country farming.

The Ruisseau de Mardonenque rises in the north and flows south down the centre of the commune gathering tributaries including the Ruisseau de Monette, the Ravin de Placaus, the Ravin des Rives, the Ravin de la Coste, the Ravin de la Ligue, and the Ruisseau de Rioubasset, which forms the south-eastern border, before continuing south to join the Lot near Saint-Geniez-d'Olt. The Ruisseau de Bonance also rises in the north of the commune and flows south towards the eastern side of the commune forming part of the eastern border before continuing south to join the Lot near Pomayrols. On the western side of the commune the Merdanson forms the western border of the commune as it flows south to join the Lot near Cabanac. The Ruisseau de Rioudis and the Ruisseau de Mandialou both rise in the commune and join the Merdanson on the western border.

Neighbouring communes and villages

Heraldry
{{Blazon-arms
|img1=Blason ville fr AurelleVerlac (Aveyron).png
|legend1=Arms of Aurelle-Verlac
|text=These arms are Canting arms with the gold referring to the commune name and the silver to silver mines.

Blazon:Azure, an escallop in Or between in chief two mullets the same and in base 5 Ermine spots in Argent arranged in fess.}}

Administration
List of Successive Mayors

Mayors from 1919

Demography
In 2012 the commune had 164 inhabitants.

Culture and heritage

Civil heritage
The Fortified Farm of Aubignac

Religious heritage
The commune has two religious buildings that are registered as historical monuments:
The Church of Saint-Jacques de Verlac (11th century) is Romanesque and depended on the abbey of La Chaise-Dieu. It is located in the village centre surrounded by a small cemetery and built from local materials: schist for the walls,  basalt, tuff, and sandstone for the cut stones. Its plan consists of a single nave with pointed columns terminated by an apse in a cul-de-four design. Two chapels, built later, act as transepts. The church contains a Bronze Bell (16th century) which is registered as a historical object.
The Church of Saint-Pierre d'Aurelle (1384) is the smallest Romanesque church in France. It has a unique history. In 1382, on the pretext of the arrival of the English, the Marquis of Beaufort, Baron of Aurelle, destroyed the church. On being excommunicated, he was obliged by the bishop to rebuild the church in a year. The new church was rebuilt inside the village in 1384 with the old materials.
The Church of Saint-Martin-de-Montbon contains a Bronze Bell (1762) which is registered as a historical object.

Other religious structures of interest
The Rode Cross was erected by the lord of Peyre in 1377.
The Berque Cross is located at Les Mazes rising from the Vergnes Cross. It was built in 1531 and marked the boundary of the barony of Aurelle between the dom lands of Aubrac and those of the Marquis of Canilhac. On one of its faces it has an expressive though stylized virgin with child.

Bibliography
Christian-Pierre Bedel, Sent-Ginièis, Aurela-Verlac, Pèira-Ficha, Pomairòls, Pradas, Senta-Aularia / Christian-Pierre Bedel and the inhabitants of the commune of Sent-Ginièis'', Rodez, Mission départementale de la culture, 1991, Al canton collection, 230 pages, ill., cov. ill., 28 cm, ISSN 1151-8375, BnF 36653864f

See also
Communes of the Aveyron department

Notes

References

External links
Non-official Aurelle-Verlac website 
Aurelle-Verlac on Géoportail, National Geographic Institute (IGN) website 
Aurelle and Verlac on the 1750 Cassini Map

Former communes of Aveyron
Populated places disestablished in 2016